The 1993 SEC Championship Game was won by the Florida Gators 28–13 over the Alabama Crimson Tide. The game was played at Legion Field in Birmingham, Alabama, on December 4, 1993, and was televised to a national audience on ABC.

In the 1993 SEC Championship game the Western Division was represented by the Alabama Crimson Tide even though they finished second in the division. The first place Auburn Tigers were on NCAA probation which prohibited them from participating in post season games. Alabama later had their 1993 season affected by the NCAA when in 1995, the NCAA found Antonio Langham guilty of receiving improper benefits after signing with an agent following the 1992 season, forcing Alabama to forfeit all games in which Langham played. Officially, Alabama finished the 1993 season with a 1–12 record, winning only their bowl game.

See also
 Alabama–Florida football rivalry

References

External links
Recap of the game from SECsports.com

Championship Game
SEC Championship Game
Alabama Crimson Tide football games
Florida Gators football games
December 1993 sports events in the United States
SEC